Crawley is a village and civil parish beside the River Windrush about  north of Witney, Oxfordshire. The parish extends from the Windrush in the south almost to village of Leafield in the northwest. The 2011 Census recorded the parish's population as 155.

Archaeology
They may date from 2400 to 1500 BC. They are a scheduled monument. In 1964 a 13th-century medieval iron arrowhead was found in the Windrush at Crawley.

History
Uphill Farmhouse was built in the 17th century.  Crawley's chapel of Saint Peter was built in 1837 as a chapel of ease for the Church of England parish church at Hailey, Oxfordshire. It has ceased to be used for worship and has been converted into a private house.  Crawley village is above a sharp bend on the Windrush. The present road bridge across the river is probably late 18th-century.  Crawley Mill on the Windrush was part of the Witney area's former blanket-making industry. It has a mill stream and was originally water-powered but was later converted to steam power. It is now an industrial estate.

Amenities
Crawley has two public houses: the 17th-century Lamb Inn and the Crawley Inn.

References

Sources & further reading

External links

Crawley Village

Civil parishes in Oxfordshire
West Oxfordshire District
Villages in Oxfordshire